
Gmina Dąbrowa Biskupia is a rural gmina (administrative district) in Inowrocław County, Kuyavian-Pomeranian Voivodeship, in north-central Poland.

Villages
Gmina Dąbrowa Biskupia contains the villages and settlements of Brudnia, Chlewiska, Chróstowo, Dąbrowa Biskupia, Dziewa, Konary, Mleczkowo, Modliborzyce, Nowy Dwór, Ośniszczewko, Ośniszczewo, Parchanie, Parchanki, Pieczyska, Pieranie, Przybysław, Radojewice, Stanomin, Walentynowo, Wola Stanomińska, Wonorze and Zagajewice.

Neighbouring gminas
Gmina Dąbrowa Biskupia is bordered by the gminas of Aleksandrów Kujawski, Dobre, Gniewkowo, Inowrocław, Koneck, Kruszwica and Zakrzewo.

References
Polish official population figures 2006

Dabrowa Biskupia
Inowrocław County